The following outline is provided as an overview of and topical guide to Sri Lanka:

Sri Lanka – island country in the northern Indian Ocean off the southeast coast of the Indian subcontinent in South Asia. Known until 1972 as Ceylon (/sɨˈlɒnˌ seɪ-ˌ siː-/), Sri Lanka has maritime borders with India to the northwest and the Maldives to the southwest. Sri Lanka has a documented history that spans over 3,000 years, but there are theories to suggest that Sri Lanka had pre-historic human settlements dating back to at least 125,000 years. Its geographic location and deep harbours made it of great strategic importance from the time of the ancient Silk Road through to World War II. Sri Lanka is a republic and a unitary state governed by a presidential system. The capital, Sri Jayawardenepura Kotte, is a suburb of the largest city, Colombo. It is also an important producer of tea, coffee, gemstones, coconuts, rubber, and the native cinnamon, the island contains tropical forests and diverse landscapes with a high amount of biodiversity.

General reference 

 Pronunciation:
 Common English country name:  Sri Lanka, archaic Ceylon
 Official English country name:  The Democratic Socialist Republic of Sri Lanka
 Adjective: Sri Lankan
 Demonym(s):
 Etymology: Name of Sri Lanka
 ISO country codes:  LK, LKA, 144
 ISO region codes:  See ISO 3166-2:LK
 Internet country code top-level domain:  .lk

Geography of Sri Lanka 

Geography of Sri Lanka
 Sri Lanka is: an island country
 Location:
 Northern Hemisphere and Eastern Hemisphere
 Indian Ocean
 between the Laccadive Sea and the Bay of Bengal
 Eurasia
 Asia
 South Asia
 Indian subcontinent (off the coast of India, on the same continental shelf)
 Time zone:  Sri Lanka Time (UTC+05:30)
 Extreme points of Sri Lanka
 High:  Pidurutalagala 
 Low:  Indian Ocean 0 m
 Land boundaries:  none
 Coastline:  Indian Ocean 1,340 km
 Population: 20,277,597 (2012) - 57th most populous country
 Area: 65,610 km2
 Atlas of Sri Lanka

Environment of Sri Lanka 

Environment of Sri Lanka
 Climate of Sri Lanka
 Environmental issues in Sri Lanka
 Ecoregions in Sri Lanka
 Renewable energy in Sri Lanka
 Protected areas of Sri Lanka
 Biosphere reserves in Sri Lanka
 National parks of Sri Lanka
 Wildlife of Sri Lanka(Flora & Fauna) 
 Birds of Sri Lanka
 Mammals of Sri Lanka

Natural geographic features of Sri Lanka 

 Beaches in Sri Lanka
 Islands in Sri Lanka
 Mountains in Sri Lanka
 Rivers in Sri Lanka
 Waterfalls in Sri Lanka
 List of World Heritage Sites in Sri Lanka

Regions of Sri Lanka

Ecoregions of Sri Lanka 

List of ecoregions in Sri Lanka
 Ecoregions in Sri Lanka

Administrative divisions of Sri Lanka 

Administrative divisions of Sri Lanka
 Provinces of Sri Lanka
 Districts of Sri Lanka

Provinces of Sri Lanka 

Provinces of Sri Lanka
Central Province
Eastern Province
North Central Province
Northern Province
North Western Province
Sabaragamuwa Province
Southern Province
Uva Province
Western Province

Districts of Sri Lanka 

Districts of Sri Lanka
 Kandy District
 Matale District
 Nuwara Eliya District
 Ampara District
 Batticaloa District
 Trincomalee District
 Anuradhapura District
 Polonnaruwa District
 Jaffna District
 Kilinochchi District
 Mannar District
 Mullaitivu District
 Vavuniya District
 Kurunegala District
 Puttalam District
 Kegalle District
 Ratnapura District
 Galle District
 Hambantota District
 Matara District
 Badulla District
 Moneragala District
 Colombo District
 Gampaha District
 Kalutara District

Demography of Sri Lanka 

Demographics of Sri Lanka

Government and politics of Sri Lanka 

Politics of Sri Lanka
 Form of government:
 Capital of Sri Lanka: Sri Jayawardenepura Kotte (shortened:Kotte)
 Elections in Sri Lanka
 Political parties in Sri Lanka

Branches of the government of Sri Lanka 

Government of Sri Lanka

Executive branch of the government of Sri Lanka 
 Head of state: President of Sri Lanka,
 Head of government: Prime Minister of Sri Lanka,
 Cabinet of Sri Lanka

Legislative branch of the government of Sri Lanka 

 Parliament of Sri Lanka (Unicameral)

Judicial branch of the government of Sri Lanka 

Court system of Sri Lanka
 Supreme Court of Sri Lanka

Foreign relations of Sri Lanka 

Foreign relations of Sri Lanka
 Diplomatic missions in Sri Lanka
 Diplomatic missions of Sri Lanka

International organization membership 
The Democratic Socialist Republic of Sri Lanka is a member of:

Asian Development Bank (ADB)
Bay of Bengal Initiative for Multi-Sectoral Technical and Economic Cooperation (BIMSTEC)
Colombo Plan (CP)
Commonwealth of Nations
Food and Agriculture Organization (FAO)
Group of 15 (G15)
Group of 24 (G24)
Group of 77 (G77)
International Atomic Energy Agency (IAEA)
International Bank for Reconstruction and Development (IBRD)
International Chamber of Commerce (ICC)
International Civil Aviation Organization (ICAO)
International Criminal Police Organization (Interpol)
International Development Association (IDA)
International Federation of Red Cross and Red Crescent Societies (IFRCS)
International Finance Corporation (IFC)
International Fund for Agricultural Development (IFAD)
International Hydrographic Organization (IHO)
International Labour Organization (ILO)
International Maritime Organization (IMO)
International Mobile Satellite Organization (IMSO)
International Monetary Fund (IMF)
International Olympic Committee (IOC)
International Organization for Migration (IOM)
International Organization for Standardization (ISO)
International Red Cross and Red Crescent Movement (ICRM)
International Telecommunication Union (ITU)

International Telecommunications Satellite Organization (ITSO)
International Trade Union Confederation (ITUC)
Inter-Parliamentary Union (IPU)
Multilateral Investment Guarantee Agency (MIGA)
Nonaligned Movement (NAM)
Organisation for the Prohibition of Chemical Weapons (OPCW)
Organization of American States (OAS) (observer)
Permanent Court of Arbitration (PCA)
South Asia Co-operative Environment Programme (SACEP)
South Asian Association for Regional Cooperation (SAARC)
United Nations (UN)
United Nations Conference on Trade and Development (UNCTAD)
United Nations Educational, Scientific, and Cultural Organization (UNESCO)
United Nations Industrial Development Organization (UNIDO)
United Nations Mission for the Referendum in Western Sahara (MINURSO)
United Nations Mission in the Sudan (UNMIS)
United Nations Organization Mission in the Democratic Republic of the Congo (MONUC)
United Nations Stabilization Mission in Haiti (MINUSTAH)
Universal Postal Union (UPU)
World Confederation of Labour (WCL)
World Customs Organization (WCO)
World Federation of Trade Unions (WFTU)
World Health Organization (WHO)
World Intellectual Property Organization (WIPO)
World Meteorological Organization (WMO)
World Tourism Organization (UNWTO)
World Trade Organization (WTO)

Law and order in Sri Lanka 

Law of Sri Lanka
 Capital punishment in Sri Lanka
 Constitution of Sri Lanka
 Crime in Sri Lanka
 Human rights in Sri Lanka
 LGBT rights in Sri Lanka
 Freedom of religion in Sri Lanka
 Law enforcement in Sri Lanka

Military of Sri Lanka 

Military of Sri Lanka
 Command
 Commander-in-chief: President of Sri Lanka
 Ministry of Defence of Sri Lanka
 Forces
 Army of Sri Lanka
 Navy of Sri Lanka
 Air Force of Sri Lanka

Local government in Sri Lanka 

Local government in Sri Lanka

History of Sri Lanka 

History of Sri Lanka
 Koon Karava
 Timeline of the history of Sri Lanka

Culture of Sri Lanka 

Culture of Sri Lanka
 Architecture in Sri Lanka
 Architecture of ancient Sri Lanka
 List of Sri Lankan architects
 Forts of Sri Lanka
 Cuisine of Sri Lanka
 Festivals in Sri Lanka
 Languages of Sri Lanka
 Media in Sri Lanka
 National symbols of Sri Lanka
 Coat of arms of Sri Lanka
 Flag of Sri Lanka
 National anthem of Sri Lanka
 Prostitution in Sri Lanka
 Public holidays in Sri Lanka
 Religion in Sri Lanka
 Buddhism in Sri Lanka
 Christianity in Sri Lanka
 Hinduism in Sri Lanka
 Islam in Sri Lanka
 List of World Heritage Sites in Sri Lanka

Art in Sri Lanka 
 Cinema of Sri Lanka
 Literature of Sri Lanka
 Music of Sri Lanka
 Television in Sri Lanka
 Theatre in Sri Lanka

Sports in Sri Lanka 

Sports in Sri Lanka
 Cricket in Sri Lanka
 Football in Sri Lanka
 Netball in Sri Lanka
 Rugby union in Sri Lanka
 Sri Lanka at the Olympics
 Sri Lanka at the Asian Games
 Sri Lanka at the Commonwealth Games

Economy and infrastructure of Sri Lanka 

Economy of Sri Lanka
 Economic rank, by nominal GDP (2007): 80th (eightieth)
 Agriculture in Sri Lanka
 Banking in Sri Lanka
 Central Bank of Sri Lanka
 Communications in Sri Lanka
 Internet in Sri Lanka
 Companies of Sri Lanka
Currency of Sri Lanka: Rupee
ISO 4217: LKR
 Energy in Sri Lanka
 Ministry of Power and Energy
 List of power stations in Sri Lanka
 Sri Lanka Stock Exchange
 Tourism in Sri Lanka
 Transport in Sri Lanka
 Airports in Sri Lanka
 Sri Lanka Railways

Education in Sri Lanka 

Education in Sri Lanka

Health in Sri Lanka 

Health in Sri Lanka
 Health care in Sri Lanka

See also 

Sri Lanka
List of international rankings

Member state of the Commonwealth of Nations
Member state of the United Nations
American Chamber of Commerce in Sri Lanka
Outline of Asia
Outline of geography

References

External links 

 Government
Official web portal of the Government of Sri Lanka
Office of the President of Sri Lanka
Ministry of Defence, Sri Lanka
Central Bank of Sri Lanka

 Tourism
The Official Website of Sri Lanka Tourist Board
Sri Lanka Travel Guide and Country Reference
Lonely Planet Destination Guide- Sri Lanka
Ministry of Tourism

 Business
Board of Investment of Sri Lanka
Sri Lanka Export Development Board
Colombo Stock Exchange
Sri Lanka Business Directory

 Other
Virtual Library Sri Lanka
The CIA World Factbook - Sri Lanka
Sri Lanka - UNESCO World Heritage Centre
Collection of slides of Sri Lanka, University of Pennsylvania library

Sri Lanka
 1